Archbishop Anba Angaelos  is the Coptic Orthodox Archbishop of London and Papal Legate to the UK and to Sydney and its Affiliated Regions.

Early Life

Angaelos was born in Cairo, Egypt and emigrated with his family to Australia when he spent his childhood years. He obtained a Bachelor of Arts, majoring in political science, philosophy and sociology, and went on to postgraduate studies in law whilst working in the same field.

Religious Life

In 1990, Angaelos returned to Egypt to join the Monastery of Saint Bishoy in Wadi-El-Natroun, where he was subsequently consecrated a monk by Pope Shenouda III. He served as Papal secretary until 1995, and was then delegated by the Pope to serve as a parish priest in the United Kingdom. He was consecrated in 1999 as a General Bishop (a rank between auxiliary bishop and chorbishop) in the United Kingdom of the Coptic Orthodox Church.

He is a patron of the Fellowship of Saint Alban and Saint Sergius.

Political Awards & Activism

In the 2015 Queen's Birthday Honours, Angaelos was appointed an Officer of the Order of the British Empire (OBE) for services to international religious freedom.

In 2021, Angaelos opposed plans by the government of New South Wales, where he was then residing, to introduce mandatory COVID-19 vaccination for all church attendees.

See also
The Holy Synod of the Coptic Orthodox Church
Coptic Orthodox Church in Europe
List of Copts

References

External links
 
 Coptic Orthodox Diocese of London
 Interviewed on ANN TV 2015 discusses Christian Minorities and Modern Citizenship

1967 births
Living people
British Oriental Orthodox Christians
British anti-vaccination activists
Coptic Orthodox bishops
Coptic Orthodox Church in the United Kingdom
Egyptian emigrants to England
21st-century Oriental Orthodox archbishops
20th-century Oriental Orthodox bishops
Australian people of Coptic descent
Egyptian emigrants to Australia
Australian emigrants to England
English people of Coptic descent
Naturalised citizens of the United Kingdom
Officers of the Order of the British Empire